A referendum on "the protection of national unity and social peace" was held in Egypt on 21 May 1978. It was approved by 98.3% of voters.

Results

References

Egypt
1978 in Egypt
Referendums in Egypt
May 1978 events in Africa